John Cunningham (1729–1773) was a Dublin born playwright, poet and actor, who spent much of his life in, and according to Allan, "whose name and fame will for ever be identified with Newcastle."

Life
John Cunningham was born in 1729 in Dublin, Ireland. His parents, who were of Scottish descent, had won a lottery, risen up the social ladder, become bankrupt, and moved back down the social ladder.

John went to Drogheda Grammar School, Drogheda, but had to leave when his father's wealth disappeared. Early in life he was attracted to the stage and the acting profession. As an actor, he never achieved any distinction, for in figure, voice, and temperament he was quite unfitted for such a profession.

He started to write in the age of twelve and at the age of 17 wrote his first drama, "Love in a mist", which was performed in Dublin. Afterwards he performed at various places, with but indifferent success, amongst others, at York, Newcastle, Alnwick, Sunderland, and Edinburgh. While gaining his living, as an actor, he still continued to write poetry. It was at Edinburgh that he first came into notice as a poet, and on leaving it he returned to Newcastle, where he had previously made his headquarters while playing in the North of England.

He lived for the remainder of his life, writing poems, and playing wherever he could get an engagement in the vicinity. His earnings were scanty, but his wants were few, and his amiable, simple character, and poetic talent, made him many friends. One of the best and truest was Mr. and Mrs. Thomas Slack. Slack was a bookseller, and publisher of the Newcastle Chronicle. Cunningham supplemented his income by writing articles for publication.

After befriending the poor poet in many ways, Slack at length took him home to his house. Cunningham was then almost worn out, but his benefactor paid him every attention that his state required. Writing to a friend, the poet says of Mr. Slack:
“His Bounty proceeds from his heart,
'Tis principle prompts the supply;
His friendship exceeds my desert,
And often suppresses a sigh.”

Death 
John Cunningham gave his last performance as an actor in Darlington on 20 June 1773. He returned to Newcastle, was taken ill, and died on 18 September 1773 at the age of 44, at his lodgings in Union Street, Newcastle.

He was buried at St John's Churchyard, a monument being placed at his grave by Mr. Slack, of the Newcastle Chronicle. This monument was restored in 1887 by public subscription, after falling into decay. In 1891 The Chronicle's current proprietor, Joseph Cowen, placed a memorial window in St John's Church in his memory.

Works 
The poetry of Cunningham is all written in a quiet, lifted strain. Some of his descriptions of natural scenery are very true and very pleasing in their simplicity; there is much tenderness and grace in his pastorals, but he never rises into passion, or allows himself to be carried away by poetic enthusiasm. There is more fire, perhaps, in his eulogy of  "Newcastle Beer" than in most of his other compositions. The theme may, to some, appear unworthy of a poet's efforts, but it must be remembered that in Cunningham's days Newcastle beer was a great institution, and the great ones of the town did not disdain on occasions to indulge in the local nectar. Often were their servants sent round to see where the beer was in best condition (each house brewed its own then), and acting on their reports, the masters would patronise mine host who had the best on tap.

His works include the following :-<br/ >
The play – Love in a mist<br/ >
A book of Poems – published 1766

Extract from an Elegy on a pile of Ruins<br/ >
Search where Ambition raged with rigour steeled<br/ >
Where Slaughter like the rapid lightning ran<br/ >
And say, while memory weeps the blood-stained field<br/ >
Where lies the chief? And where the common man?<br/ >
Newcastle Beer – A lyrical poem with classical illusions, aimed at the moneyed class<br/ >
Holiday Gown

References

External links
John Cunningham at the Eighteenth-Century Poetry Archive (ECPA)
Farne Folk Archives
Newcastle songster published by J Marshall c1812
Allan’s Illustrated Edition of Tyneside songs 1891
      www.tomorrows-history.com a short biography 
https://web.archive.org/web/20040219103532/http://online.northumbria.ac.uk/faculties/art/humanities/cns/m-cunningham.html www.northumbria.ac.uk] – a short description
www.accessmylibrary – on problems of biography of JC
citanka.cz some details in a translation of a poem

1729 births
1773 deaths
Irish male poets
Irish male stage actors
18th-century Irish dramatists and playwrights
18th-century Irish poets
Writers from Dublin (city)
Writers from Newcastle upon Tyne
Geordie songwriters
18th-century Irish male actors
18th-century English male writers
Irish emigrants to Great Britain